Paul Carey (November 1978 – 6 November 2020) was an Irish hurler. At club level he lined out with Patrickswell and was also a member of the Limerick senior hurling team.

Playing career

Carey first played hurling alongside his brothers, Ciarán and Pa, with the Patrickswell club. After success in the minor and under-21 grades, he subsequently joined the club's senior team and won a total of four Limerick County Championship medals, including one as captain of the team in 2003. At inter-county level, Carey lined out with the Limerick minor and under-21 teams, before making his first appearance for the senior team in a pre-season South-East League game in November 1998. It would be 2002 before he made his competitive debut in a National League game against Derry. In a brief inter-county career, Carey made just two league appearances for Limerick.

Personal life

Carey was killed in a road traffic collision in Dubai on 6 November 2020, aged 41.

Honours

Patrickswell
Limerick Senior Hurling Championship (4): 1996, 1997, 2000, 2003

References

1978 births
2020 deaths
Patrickswell hurlers
Limerick inter-county hurlers
Road incident deaths in the United Arab Emirates